Richard Edwin Brooks (1865–1919) was born in Braintree, Massachusetts, studied in Paris under the sculptor Jean-Paul Aubé (1837–1916).  His early work Chant de la Vague (Song of the Wave) was idealistic; later works were more conventional statues.

Notable works
Statue of Thomas Cass, in Boston (1899).
Bust of Francis Amasa Walker in the Boston Public Library (1901).
Statues for Maryland in the National Statuary Hall Collection (1903):
Charles Carroll
John Hanson
Statue of William Henry Seward, in Seattle (1909) for the Alaska–Yukon–Pacific Exposition and moved to Volunteer Park in 1910.
Statue of Robert Treat Paine (a Signer of the Declaration of Independence) in Taunton, Massachusetts (1904)
Statue of John H. McGraw, in Seattle (1913).

Gallery

Honors
Elected to National Sculpture Society (1897).
Gold medal in sculpture at the Buffalo Pan-American Exposition 1901.
Elected to American Academy of Arts and Letters in 1908.

Notes

References

External links

The Points on the Park Sculpture Park
The Monumental City Famous Monuments
New York at the Louisiana Purchase Exposition, St. Louis 1904

Pictures of the artist

Pictures of sculptures

Newspaper

1865 births
1919 deaths
Members of the American Academy of Arts and Letters
People from Braintree, Massachusetts
Sculptors from Massachusetts
20th-century American sculptors
20th-century American male artists
19th-century American sculptors
19th-century American male artists
American male sculptors
Artists of the Boston Public Library